is a passenger railway station in the town of Okutama, Tokyo, Japan, operated by the East Japan Railway Company (JR East).

Lines
Hatonosu Station is served by the Ōme Line, located 33.8 kilometers from the terminus of the line at Tachikawa Station.

Station layout
The station has two opposed side platforms serving two tracks. This station can only accommodate trains of 4-car lengths. The station is unattended.

Platforms

History
The station opened on 1 July 1944. It became part of the East Japan Railway Company (JR East) with the breakup of the Japanese National Railways on 1 April 1987.

Passenger statistics
In fiscal 2014, the station was used by an average of 181 passengers daily (boarding passengers only).

The passenger figures for previous years are as shown below.

Surrounding area

Shiromasu Dam

See also
 List of railway stations in Japan

References

External links

  

Railway stations in Tokyo
Ōme Line
Stations of East Japan Railway Company
Railway stations in Japan opened in 1944
Okutama, Tokyo